Aurach may refer to:

Places
 Aurach, Germany, municipality in the district of Ansbach in Bavaria in Germany
 Aurach bei Kitzbühel, municipality in Kitzbühel District in the Kitzbühel Alps in the Austrian state of Tyrol
 Aurach am Hongar, municipality in the district of Vöcklabruck in the Austrian state of Upper Austria

Rivers
 Aurach (Regnitz, Mittelfranken), in Middle Franconia, Bavaria, Germany, tributary of the Regnitz
 Aurach (Regnitz, Oberfranken), in Upper Franconia, Bavaria, Germany, tributary of the Regnitz
 Aurach (Rednitz), in Bavaria, Germany, tributary of the Rednitz
 Aurach (Ager), in Upper Austria, tributary of the Ager